The Oratorio de la Santa Cueva is an underground church in Cádiz.

It was restored by the Veracruz-born priest, Don José Sáenz de Santa María,
who also commissioned Haydn's The Seven Last Words of Christ for performance in the cave.

References

Churches in the Province of Cádiz